Norte Shopping is the largest shopping center in the city of Rio de Janeiro and the second largest in Brazil. Established in 1986, the complex has undergone several major expansions.

The complex comprises 343 shops, with 11 anchor stores, a medical center, a theater (Teatro Miguel Falabella), a college (Estacio de Sa - North Campus Shop), a school (Centro Educacional da Lagoa), second language courses (French Alliance and SCAN), an indoor kart track, an ice skating rink, and various services.

References

Shopping malls in Rio de Janeiro (city)
Shopping malls established in 1986
1986 establishments in Brazil